The House of Toulouse, sometimes called House of Saint-Gilles or Raimondines, is the name of the dynasty that ruled the County of Toulouse.

History

Creation of the County of Toulouse

The county of Toulouse is a former county in southern France, the holder of which was one of six primitive lay peers.

A count of Toulouse was appointed in 778 by Charlemagne in favor of a certain Torson, following the defeat of Roncesvalles, to coordinate the defense and the fight against the Basques, and integrated into the duchy of Aquitaine, when it was created three years later: William the Pious, Duke of Aquitaine, had the title of Count of Toulouse. From the death in 852 of Fredelo son of Fulcoald, count of Rouergue and Senegund of Toulouse, who was governor (custos civitas) of Toulouse, Pailhars, Rodez, and Limoges, the center of Aquitaine moves to Poitiers and Count of Rouergue, were also rulers of Toulouse.

Starting with Fulcoald of Rouergue, the County of Toulouse became hereditary. His son Fredelo becomes Count of Toulouse in 849. His brother Raymond I succeeded him in 852.

The House of Toulouse

From the ninth century, the House of Toulouse was established in its fief. The elder line of the House of Rouergue became Counts of Toulouse. The functions of the Marquis of Gothia and Duke of Narbonne, which they also possessed, became empty and meaningless titles which were transmitted to the younger branch of Rouergue. At the death of the Countess Bertha of Rouergue, these titles were inherited by a scion of the senior line, Raymond, Count of Saint-Gilles, which allowed him to be an early territorial power. Pons, Count of Toulouse, father of Raymond of Saint Gilles, bequeathed all his possessions to his eldest son William, on the condition that if William were to die without a son, the properties would then pass to Raymond. Hence, when William IV died, Raymond succeeded his brother as Raymond IV of Toulouse, although the succession was claimed by Philippa, William IV's daughter, who married William IX, Duke of Aquitaine. Raymond of Saint-Gilles managed to establish the principality as a power, which he gave to his son Bertrand, after departing for the First Crusade.

Bertrand, with his brother Alfonso Jordan, must fight against the Duke of Aquitaine, who seized Toulouse several times, but had to evacuate each time due to popular revolt. Then the counts of Toulouse fought against the Counts of Barcelona as they competed for expanding their influence in Languedoc and Provence. Peace was finally concluded in the second half of the 12th century. At that time, the city of Toulouse is one of the largest in Europe, and the House of Toulouse reigned over a rich and powerful territory. The counts of Toulouse, who played a significant part in the Crusades, also possessed the County of Tripoli in the Holy Land.

Fall

In the 12th century, a new heresy, Catharism, developed in the region, supported by many local lords. Count Raymond V demanded the aid of Cîteaux to fight against the Cathars, but in the early 13th century, their presence is such that Raymond VI cannot fight against them without alienating a large part of the population. The murder of the papal legate Pierre de Castelnau triggered the Albigensian Crusade. Launched in 1208 by Pope Innocent III, it aimed to crush heresy and to subdue the powerful lords of the south and their wealthy domains. In 1215, Simon de Montfort, who took the leadership of the Crusade, defeated the army of Toulouse and entered the city. He proclaimed himself Count of Toulouse but was killed in 1218 by the inhabitants. After this event, the counts of Toulouse sided with the people against the royal armies. But after a new offensive launched by King Louis VIII, Raymond VII gave in and signed the Treaty of Meaux in 1229.

The repression against the Cathars increased and the County of Toulouse gradually passes under the domination of royal power. Joan of Toulouse, daughter of Raymond VII, married Alphonse of Poitiers, brother of St. Louis. As Count of Toulouse, Alphonse administered the city from Paris. In 1271, the county of Toulouse merged into the crown as an inheritance of Philip III, King of France, nephew of Alphonse.

Genealogy and descendants of the House of Toulouse

 Fulcoald of Rouergue
 Fredelo, Count of Toulouse
  Raymond I, Count of Toulouse
 Bernard II, Count of Toulouse
 Fulgaud, viscount of Limoges
  House of Limoges
 Odo, Count of Toulouse
 Raymond II, Count of Toulouse
  Raymond Pons, Count of Toulouse
  Raymond III, Count of Toulouse
  Raymond (IV), Count of Toulouse
 William III, Count of Toulouse
 Raymond
 Hugh
 Pons, Count of Toulouse
 William IV, Count of Toulouse
 Raymond IV, Count of Toulouse
 Bertrand, Count of Toulouse (questionable legitimacy)
  Pons, Count of Tripoli
  Raymond II, Count of Tripoli
  Raymond III, Count of Tripoli
  Alfonso Jordan
 Raymond V, Count of Toulouse
 Raymond VI, Count of Toulouse
 Raymond VII, Count of Toulouse
  Joan, Countess of Toulouse
  Bertrand (illegitimate)
  Viscounts of Bruniquel
 Aubri
  Baldwin
  Alfonso
  Hugh, Abbot of Saint-Gilles
  Bertrand
  Ermengol of Rouergue
 Raymond II of Rouergue
 Raymond III of Rouergue
  Hugh of Rouergue
  Bertha of Rouergue
  Hugh, Bishop of Toulouse
  Hugh, Count of Quercy
  Aribert, abbot of Vabres

The Counts of Rouergue

From 852, the County of Toulouse is the possession of the counts of Rouergue, and transmitted hereditarily.

The Counts of Toulouse

The Counts of Rouergue settled their capital in Toulouse. The senior line became Counts of Toulouse while a cadet branch retained the County of Rouergue.

The Counts of Tripoli

During the Crusades, Raymond of Saint-Gilles established the county of Tripoli. It remained in the family until 1187, when it passed to the House of Antioch.

Toulouse-Bruniquel

The last agnatic descendant of the Counts of Toulouse, of the "Raymondine" branch, died on 13 August 1577 in the person of Jean Antoine, Viscount of Montclar and Baron of Salvagnac. A Protestant captain, he was killed by Catholics in a skirmish in the countryside. He belonged to a cadet branch descended from Bertrand of Toulouse, Viscount of Bruniquel and natural son of Raymond VI.

Toulouse-Lautrec

According to a genealogy established in the 17th century, this family is considered a branch of the House of Toulouse which they represented in their coat of arms. According to recent research, the Toulouse-Lautrec would agnatic descendants of the viscounts of Lautrec, a line which could be traced back to the end of the ninth century, which would also be the origin of the Trencavel

The House of Limoges

Second son of Raymond I, Count of Toulouse, Foucher of Limoges founded the House of Limoges in 876 that ruled Limoges until 1139.

Arms

References

Counts of Toulouse
Counts of Rouergue
Counts of Tripoli